Huber is a  German-language surname. It derives from the German word Hube meaning hide, a unit of land a farmer might possess, granting them the status of a free tenant. It is in the top ten most common surnames in the German-speaking world, especially in Austria and Switzerland where it is the surname of approximately 0.3% of the population.

Variants arising from varying dialectal pronunciation of the surname include Hueber, Hüber, Huemer, Humer, Haumer, Huebner and (anglicized) Hoover.

People with the surname Huber

A
Adam Huber (born 1987), American actor and model.
Alexander Huber (born 1968), German climber and mountaineer
Alexander Huber (football) (born 1985), German football player
Alyson Huber (born 1972), Californian legislator elected to the State Assembly in 2008
Anja Huber (born 1983), German skeleton racer
Anke Huber (born 1974), German tennis player
Anthony Huber (born 1994), killed in the Kenosha unrest shooting

B
Bruno Huber (1930–1999), Swiss astrologer, husband of Louise Huber

C
Cheri Huber (born c. 1944), American independent Soto Zen teacher
Charles M. Huber (born 1956), German politician
Chuck Huber (born 1971), American voice actor

D
Don Huber (born 1957), American soccer (football) forward

E
Erwin Huber (born 1946), German conservative politician

F
François Huber (1750–1831), Swiss naturalist
Franz Josef Huber (1902–1975), German SS general and Generalmajor der Polizei in Austria

G
Gerold Huber (born 1969), German pianist
Gregory Huber (born 1956), American lawyer and Wisconsin Circuit Court Judge
Grischa Huber (1944–2021), German theatre and film actress
Gusti Huber (1914–1993), Austrian-American actress

H
Harold Huber (1909–1959), American character actor of the 1930s/1940s
Herbert Huber (botanist) (1931–2005), German botanist
Herbert Huber (luger), Italian luger in the 1980s
Herbert Huber (skier) (1944–1970), Austrian skier
Hermann J. Huber (1954–2009), German writer and journalist
Herta Huber (born 1926), German writer and poet

J
Jacques Huber (1867–1914), Swiss-Brazilian botanist
Jessica Huber (born 1970), American speech scientist
Johannes Huber (born 1987), German politician
JoKarl Huber (1902–1996), German artist
Jon Huber (1979–2020), American professional wrestler better known as Brodie Lee and Luke Harper
Jon Huber (born 1981), American baseball pitcher
Justin Huber (born 1982), Australian baseball player

K
Klaus Huber (1924–2017), Swiss composer and academic teacher
Kurt Huber (1893–1943), German professor, executed by the Nazis in 1943
Kurt Huber (tenor) (born 1937), Swiss tenor

L
Larry Huber (born 1950), American television producer, writer, and animator
Lee Huber (1919–2005), American basketball player
Liezel Huber (born 1976), South African tennis player
Liza Huber (born 1975), American television actress
Lotti Huber (1912–1998), German actress
Louise Huber (1930–1999), Swiss astrologer, wife of Bruno Huber
Ludwig Ferdinand Huber (1764–1804), German writer, husband of Therese Huber

M
Max Huber (disambiguation), several people

N
Nicolaus A. Huber (born 1939), German composer
Norbert Huber (born 1964), Italian luger

O
Oscar E. Huber (1917–2017), American politician, rancher, and farmer

P
Peter J. Huber (born 1934), Swiss statistician
Peter W. Huber (born 1952), American writer and lawyer
Pierre Antoine François Huber (1775–1832), French general

R
Robert Huber (born 1937), German biochemist
Robert Huber (engineer) (1901–1995), Swiss engineer
Robert Huber (sport shooter) (1878–1946), Finnish sport shooter
Robert J. Huber (1922–2001), U.S. Representative from Michigan
 Roi Huber (born 1997), Israeli basketball player
Rupert Huber (born 1967), Austrian composer and musician

S
Sophie Huber (born 1985), French freestyle swimmer

T
Terry E. Huber (1959 -   ) American radio personality and musician
Thaddäus Huber (1742–1798), Austrian violinist and composer
Therese Huber (1764–1829), German author
Thomas Huber (born 1966), German climber and mountaineer
Tomáš Huber, Czech footballer
Tytus Maksymilian Huber (1872–1950), Polish mechanical engineer, educator, and scientist

U
Ulrik Huber (1636–1694), Dutch jurist

V
Vernon Huber (1899–1967), 36th Governor of American Samoa
Victor Aimé Huber (1800–1869), German social reformer, travel writer and a literature historian

W
Wilfried Huber (born 1970), Italian luger
William Russel Huber (1903–1982), US Navy sailor, Medal of Honor awardee
Willie Huber (1958–2010), German born professional ice hockey defenceman
Wolf Huber (c. 1485–1553), Austrian painter
Wolfgang Huber (born 1940), German physician and specialist in internal and environmental medicine
Wolfgang Huber (born 1942), German bishop

See also 
 Hüber (German-language surname)
 Hueber (French-language surname)
 Pou (surname)
 Pou (disambiguation)

German-language surnames
Jewish surnames
Surnames from status names
Surnames of South Tyrolean origin
Surnames of Austrian origin